Grey Bruce Health Services is a hospital network in Grey and Bruce counties in Ontario, Canada.

It operates six hospitals sites, including the 400-bed Owen Sound Regional Hospital. The other five hospitals are Lion's Head Hospital, Markdale Hospital, Meaford Hospital, Southampton Hospital and Wiarton Hospital.

As of 2022, the Chief Executive Officer was Gary Sims.

Gallery

See also
List of hospitals in Canada

References

External links
Official website

Medical and health organizations based in Ontario
Hospital networks in Canada